Jaegers Shop is an unincorporated community in Franklin County, in the U.S. state of Missouri.

History
Variant names were "Cedar Fork", Cedarfork", and "Jaeger". The name Cedar Fork was after nearby Cedar Fork creek, while Jaeger was the name of William F. Jaeger, a local blacksmith.  A post office called Cedar Fork was established in 1858, and remained in operation until 1907.

References

Unincorporated communities in Franklin County, Missouri
Unincorporated communities in Missouri